The University of Lille (abbreviated as ULille, UDL or univ-lille) is a French public research university based in Lille, Hauts-de-France. It has its origins in the University of Douai (1559), and resulted from the merger of three universities – Lille 1 University of Science and Technology, Lille 2 University of Health and Law, and Charles de Gaulle University – Lille III in 2018. With more than 74,000 students, it is one of the largest universities in France and one of the largest French-speaking universities in the world. Since 2017, the university has been funded as one of the French universities of excellence. It benefits from an endowment of 500 million euros to accelerate its strategy in education, research, international development and outreach.  

With 66 research labs, 350 PhD theses supported per year and 3,000 scientific publications each year, it is well represented in the research community; it collaborates with many organizations (Pasteur Institute of Lille, CHU Lille University Hospital, CNRS, INSERM, INRA, INRIA etc.) and schools (École Centrale de Lille, École des Mines-Télécom de Lille-Douai (IMT Lille Douai), Sciences Po Lille etc.).

Until 2019, the university was the main component of the Community of Universities and Institutions (COMUE) Lille Nord de France. It still operates the European Doctoral College, which federates universities and other higher learning institutes in the Hauts-de-France region.

Schools and divisions

The University of Lille has 15 Schools and Divisions, which are spread into six major domains:

 Arts, Literature, and Languages;
 Law, Economics, and Management;
 Health;
 Humanities and Social sciences;
 Sports;
 Science and Technology.

The University of Lille officially has five main university campuses, located in different cities of the Métropole européenne de Lille.It also includes campuses in Arras, Gravelines, Valenciennes, Outreau and Wimereux.

Campus Cité Scientifique
It is the university campus dedicated to Science and Technology and located in the Villeneuve-d'Ascq technopole. The campus has 150 hectares and a hundred buildings, and the vast majority of places is occupied by the Departments of the Faculty of Science and Technology (Biology, Chemistry, Mathematics, Physics, Computer Science, Electronics/Electrical Engineering/Automation (EEA), Mechanics, Earth Science). There are also several engineering schools (Ecole Centrale de Lille, École nationale supérieure de chimie de Lille, École des Mines-Télécom de Lille-Douai (IMT Lille Douai) etc.) and many research laboratories (CNRS, INSERM, INRIA etc.). The buildings are spread around the "LILLIAD Learning Center Innovation" (the ultra modern scientific library of the University of Lille with exhibition spaces and conference rooms); and the campus is attached to the European Science Park of "Haute-Borne".

 Faculty of Science and Technology
 Faculty of Economics, Social Sciences and Geographical Studies (FASEST)
 Polytech Lille (engineering school)
 Institute of Technology

Campus Santé
It is the campus dedicated to Health and located between the cities of Lille (South) and Loos; it is the largest university hospital complex in Europe spread over nearly 350 hectares. The Faculties, Institutes and Departments of the university share the premises with the CHU Lille University Hospital and also with the companies and laboratories of "Eurasanté".

 Faculty of Medicine
 Faculty of Pharmacy
 Faculty of Dental Surgery
 Faculty of Engineering and Health Management (ILIS)

Campus Pont de Bois
It is the campus dedicated to Humanities, Social Sciences, Arts, Literature and Languages. It is located in Villeneuve-d'Ascq.

 Faculty of Humanities (FHUMA)
 Faculty of Languages, Cultures and Societies (FLCS)
 Faculty of Psychology and Education Sciences (PSYSEF)
 School of Architecture and Landscape of Lille 
 Institute for Musicians Intervening in Schools (CFMI)

Campus Lille-Ronchin
This campus is spread between Lille city centre, the  district of Moulins in Lille, and the neighboring commune of Ronchin. It is dedicated to Law, Management, Journalism and Sports. It includes the University's headquarters, located in the Lille-Center district, 42 rue Paul Duez.

 Faculty of Sport Sciences and Physical Education (STAPS)
 Faculty of Law; Political and Social Sciences
Sciences Po Lille
École supérieure de journalisme de Lille
 Institute of Business Administration (IAE Lille) (Old Town of Lille and Moulins)

Campus Roubaix - Tourcoing
This campus includes several educational sites spread over the close communes of Roubaix and Tourcoing, municipalities of the European Metropolis of Lille.

 Institute of Marketing and Distribution Management (IMMD)
 UFR of Applied Foreign Languages (LEA)
 Institute of Technology (Tourcoing and Roubaix)
 École nationale supérieure des arts et industries textiles

Research 
The University of Lille is a member of the CURIF: Coordination of French research-intensive universities. CURIF brings together the most important French universities in terms of research.

Notable faculty and alumni 

Several former professor or researchers from the University of Lille obtained the CNRS gold medal, the highest scientific distinction in France: Émile Borel (1954), Raoul Blanchard (1960), Paul Pascal (1966), Georges Chaudron (1969), Henri Cartan (1976), Jacques Le Goff (1991), Pierre Bourdieu (1993).

René Cassin won the Nobel Peace Prize in 1968.

Louis Pasteur was the first dean of the science faculty.

Faustin-Archange Touadéra, who holds two doctorates in mathematics from the University of Lille and the Yaoundé University, was rector of University of Bangui from 2005 to 2008, then Prime Minister from 2008 to 2013, before being elected President of the Central African Republic in February 2016.

Notable faculty, staff and alumni in alphabetical order:
 Charles Barrois (1851-1939), professor, geologist.
 Joseph Boussinesq (1842-1929), professor, mathematician, fluid mechanics specialist.
 Albert Calmette co-inventor of the BCG vaccine.
 Albert Châtelet (1883-1960), professor, mathematician, politician.
 Louis Chauvel (1967-), professor, sociologist.
 Marc-Philippe Daubresse (1953-), mayor, member of parliament, French Minister for Youth and Active Solidarities.
 Jean Théodore Delacour (1890-1985), doctor, ornithologist.
 Louis Dollo (1857-1931), paleontologist.
 Marc Drillech, sociologist and President of universities.
 Claude Dubar (1945-2015), professor, sociology.
 Paul Dubreil, mathematician.
 Roger Gabillard (1926-2012), professor, co-inventor of Véhicule Automatique Léger VAL (driverless metro).
 Alfred Mathieu Giard, zoologist and politician.
 Iris Mittenaere, Miss Universe 2016.
 Étienne Gilson, philosopher, historian and politician.
 Henri Gouhier, member of the French Academy.
 Camille Guérin, co-inventor of the BCG vaccine.
 Jean Hélion (1904-1987), painter.
 Jacky Hénin (1960-), politician.
 Victor Henry, linguist.
 Vladimir Jankélévitch (1903-1985), philosopher, musicologist.
 Joseph Kampé de Fériet (1893-1982), professor, physicist, chairman of mechanics from 1930 to 1969.
 Henri de Lacaze-Duthiers (1821-1901), professor, anatomiste, biologist, zoologist.
 Claude Auguste Lamy (1820-1878), professor, chemist, discoverer of the element thallium.
 Eugène Lefebvre, pioneering aviator.
 Pierre Macherey, philosopher.
 Szolem Mandelbrojt (1899-1983), professor, mathematician.
 Mohammad Ali Mojtahedi (1908-1997), Iranian university professor and lifetime principal of the Alborz High School in Tehran.
 Paul Painlevé (1863-1933), professor, mathematician.
 Henri Padé (1863-1953), professor, mathematician.
 Maxime Piquette, tech innovator, founder of RadioKing and Ausha.
 Roger Salengro, minister.
 Jean Jacques Thomas, littérateur, academic, and an author
 Ernest Vessiot (1865-1952), professor, mathematician.
 Florence Jany-Catrice, professor

See also 
 European Doctoral College Lille Nord de France
 University of Douai

References 

Universities and colleges in Lille
Educational institutions established in 1854
Universities in Hauts-de-France
1854 establishments in France
Universities and colleges formed by merger in France